Whittingham is a civil parish in the City of Preston, Lancashire, England.  It contains 17 listed buildings that are recorded in the National Heritage List for England.  Of these, one is at Grade II*, the middle grade, and the others are at Grade II, the lowest grade.  The parish contains the village of Whittingham and part of the village of Goosnargh, and is otherwise mainly rural.  It also contains the former Whittingham Hospital.  Most of the listed buildings in the parish are houses and associated structures, farmhouses, and farm buildings.  The other listed buildings are a restored wayside cross, a public house, and the former chapel of the hospital.

Key

Buildings

Notes and references

Notes

Citations

Sources

Lists of listed buildings in Lancashire
Buildings and structures in the City of Preston